There are over 20,000 Grade II* listed buildings in England. This page is a list of these buildings in the district of West Devon in Devon.

West Devon

|}

Notes

External links

Borough of West Devon
West Devon